Serrières may refer to the following places:

France
 Serrières, Ardèche, in the department of Ardèche
 Serrières, Saône-et-Loire, in the department of Saône-et-Loire
 Serrières-de-Briord, in the department of Ain
 Serrières-en-Chautagne, in the department of Savoie
 Serrières-sur-Ain, in the department of Ain

Switzerland
 Serrières, Neuchâtel, in the canton of Neuchâtel
 Stade de Serrières, a football stadium